The Stygnidae are a family of neotropical harvestmen within the suborder Laniatores.

Name
The name of the type genus is derived from Ancient Greek stygnos "diabolic being".

Description
Body length ranges from about one to six millimeters. The color ranges from light brown to reddish. Some Heterostygninae have white patches, stripes or spots on the dorsal scutum.

Distribution
The Heterostygninae are found in the Lesser Antilles, Nomoclastinae are endemic to Colombia, and the Stygninae live from north of the Tropic of Capricorn (central South America). Most species live in the Amazonian rainforest. However, half the species have only been collected once, so distribution of species is poorly known.

Relationships
The Stygnidae are sister to Cosmetidae and Gonyleptidae, and belong to the same group inside Gonyleptoidea as these and Cranaidae and Manaosbiidae. The Stygnidae are monophyletic.

Genera

See the List of Stygnidae species for a list of currently described species.

Heterostygninae Roewer, 1913
 Eutimesius Roewer, 1913
 Innoxius Pinto-da-Rocha, 1997
 Minax Pinto-da-Rocha, 1997
 Stenostygnellus Roewer, 1913
 Stygnidius Simon, 1879
 Stygnoplus Simon, 1879
 Timesius Simon, 1879
 Yapacana Pinto-da-Rocha, 1997

Nomoclastinae Roewer, 1943
 Nomoclastes Sørensen, 1932

Stygninae Simon, 1879
 Actinostygnoides Goodnight & Goodnight, 1942
 Auranus Mello-Leitão, 1941
 Iguarassua Roewer, 1943
 Kaapora Pinto-da-Rocha, 1997
 Metaphareus Roewer, 1912
 Niceforoiellus Mello-Leitão, 1941
 Ortonia Wood, 1869
 Paraphareus Goodnight & Goodnight, 1943
 Phareus Simon, 1879
 Pickeliana Mello-Leitão, 1932
 Planophareus Goodnight & Goodnight, 1943
 Protimesius Roewer, 1913
 Sickesia H.E.M. Soares, 1979
 Stenophareus Goodnight & Goodnight, 1943
 Stenostygnoides Roewer, 1913
 Stygnus Perty, 1833
 Verrucastygnus Pinto-da-Rocha, 1997

incertae sedis
 Gaibulus Roewer, 1943

Footnotes

References
 Joel Hallan's Biology Catalog: Stygnopsidae
  (eds.) (2007): Harvestmen - The Biology of Opiliones. Harvard University Press 

Harvestmen
Harvestman families